Llorach is a surname. Notable people with the surname include:

Alfred Benlloch Llorach (1917-2013), Spanish inventor
Eva Llorach (born 1979), Spanish actress
Gaëtan Llorach (born 1974), French former alpine skier

See also
Llorac, a rural municipality and village in Catalonia, Spain